Winkless is a surname. Notable people with the surname include:

 Brock Winkless (1959–2015), American puppeteer and visual effects technician
 Jeff Winkless (1941–2006), American film actor, voice actor and music composer
 Laurie Winkless, physicist and science writer
 Terence H. Winkless, producer, director, actor and writer of motion pictures and television